Shining Victory  is a 1941 American drama film based on the 1940 play  Jupiter Laughs, by A. J. Cronin.  It stars James Stephenson, Geraldine Fitzgerald, Donald Crisp, and Barbara O'Neil. It is the first film directed by Irving Rapper. Bette Davis makes a brief cameo appearance as a nurse.

Plot summary
Dr. Paul Venner, a brilliant research psychiatrist, is driven out of Budapest by his superior, who has published and taken credit for Paul's work. In London, an old friend, Dr. Drewett, introduces him to the head of a Scottish sanitarium who offers him the opportunity to continue his research on dementia praecox, a disease from which Paul's father suffered.

Dr. Mary Murray becomes his laboratory assistant. They fall in love, although she plans to engage in medical missionary work in China in a year's time.  Paul convinces her to remain with him, and the two become betrothed. A fire breaks out in the lab, and Mary dies trying to salvage Paul's irreplaceable records. Deeply distressed, Paul turns down posts at several prestigious universities in order to realize Mary's dream of helping the sick in China.

The working title of the film was Winged Victory, but this was changed after it was discovered that Moss Hart was writing a play with that title. Hart's Winged Victory was filmed in 1944.

Cast
James Stephenson as Dr. Paul Venner
Geraldine Fitzgerald as Dr. Mary Murray
Donald Crisp as Dr. Drewett
Barbara O'Neil as Miss Leeming
Montagu Love as Dr. Blake
Sig Ruman as Professor Herman Von Reiter
George Huntley, Jr. as Dr. Thornton
Richard Ainley as Dr. Hale
Bruce Lester as Dr. Bentley
Leonard Mudie as Mr. Foster
Doris Lloyd as Mrs. Foster
Frank Reicher as Dr. Esterhazy
Hermine Sterler as Miss Hoffman 
Billy Bevan as Chivers
Clare Verdera as Miss Dennis 
Crauford Kent as Dr. Corliss
Alec Craig as Jeweller
Louise Brien as Nurse 
Bette Davis as Nurse
Barlowe Borland as Patient (uncredited)

See also
 List of American films of 1941

External links 

Shining Victory at Turner Classic Movies (trailer)
TCM article

1941 films
1941 drama films
American drama films
American black-and-white films
1940s English-language films
Films scored by Max Steiner
Films about psychiatry
Films based on works by A. J. Cronin
American films based on plays
Films directed by Irving Rapper
Films set in Scotland
Films set in London
Films set in the 20th century
Medical-themed films
Warner Bros. films
Films with screenplays by Howard Koch (screenwriter)
1941 directorial debut films
1940s American films